Kutayba Yusuf Ahmed Alghanim (born January 7, 1944) is a Kuwaiti billionaire businessperson. He is the charman of Alghanim Industries.

Early life and education 
Alghanim attended University of California, Berkeley and completed his Bachelor of Arts/Science in 1970.

Career 
Alghanim started his career when he returned from California after completion of his studies. In 1970, Kutayba returned to Kuwait and ventured into the furniture retail industry. He initiated an entrepreneurial venture by personally financing a store called "Al-Dar." Alghanim was appointed as a managing director for Alghanim Industries. He currently serves as a chairman at Alghanim Industries.

Honours 

 Forbes World Richest People List: 2011-2013

References 

Living people
1944 births
21st-century Kuwaiti people